Arthur William Childs-Clarke (13 May 1905 – 19 February 1980) was an English first-class cricketer who played for Middlesex and Northamptonshire.

Career
Born in Exeter, he played 10 times for Middlesex between 1923 and 1934, and captained the second XI from then until the outbreak of World War II. In 1947 he took over the captaincy of Northamptonshire for two seasons in which the county finished bottom both years, managing to win only five out of 56 matches. Childs-Clarke averaged 18.31 in 1947 and 13.16 the following year.

References

External links
 
 

1905 births
1980 deaths
English cricketers
Middlesex cricketers
Northamptonshire cricketers
Northamptonshire cricket captains
Cricketers from Exeter
Minor Counties cricketers
H. D. G. Leveson Gower's XI cricketers